George Larry Jameson (born February 1, 1953 in Washington, D.C.) is a former National Football League defensive tackle who played for the Tampa Bay Buccaneers in 1976. He attended Rantoul High School and then Indiana University before being taken in the 6th round, 152nd overall, by the St. Louis Cardinals in the 1975 NFL Draft.

References

Living people
1953 births
Players of American football from Washington, D.C.
Tampa Bay Buccaneers players
American football defensive tackles
Indiana Hoosiers football players